Bradley Raymond Gushue, ONL (born June 16, 1980) is a Canadian curler from St. John's, Newfoundland and Labrador. Gushue, along with teammates Russ Howard, Mark Nichols, Jamie Korab and Mike Adam, represented Canada in curling at the 2006 Winter Olympics, where they won the gold medal by defeating Finland 10–4. He also represented Canada at the 2022 Winter Olympics, where he won a bronze medal. In addition to the Olympics, Gushue won the 2017 World Men's Curling Championship with teammates Mark Nichols, Brett Gallant, and Geoff Walker. He is a record five-time Brier champion skip, having won in 2017, 2018, 2020, 2022, and 2023 all with Nichols, Gallant and Walker, except for 2023 with E. J. Harnden replacing Gallant. Their win in 2017 was Newfoundland and Labrador's first Brier title in 41 years.  At the 2018 Tim Hortons Brier, Gushue set a new record for Brier game wins as a skip, breaking a three-way tie with previous record-holders Russ Howard and Kevin Martin.

Career
Gushue is a six-time (1995, 1996, 1998, 1999, 2000, 2001) provincial junior curling champion in his home province of Newfoundland, the last five as skip. He finished with a bronze medal at the 1999 Canadian Junior Curling Championships, a silver medal at the 2000 Canadian Junior Curling Championships, and in 2001, he not only won the provincial championship but the 2001 Canadian Juniors and World Junior Championships as well. Gushue was also the alternate for John Morris at the 1998 World Junior Championships, which Morris won.

After his outstanding career as a junior, Gushue made an impressive transition into men's curling, and his team quickly became a competitive force. Gushue qualified for the 2003 Nokia Brier, where he finished with a 6–5 record. By the 2004 Nokia Brier, Gushue proved not only was he one of the best curlers in Newfoundland, but one of the best in Canada, when his team finished with an 8–4 record.  The following year, Gushue qualified for the 2005 Tim Hortons Brier, where his team once again finished 6–5.

In May 2005, Gushue brought in former world champion Russ Howard as fifth man on the team to bring experience and advice for the Canadian Olympic trials. Shortly afterwards, second Mike Adam volunteered to step aside for Howard, as the team felt that Howard's skills and experience gave them the best chance to make it to the Olympics. Howard, playing as second, was given the right to call the team's shots as a skip would but would defer to Gushue for the final word on calls. (Under international rules, Howard was nominally the skip, holding the broom in the house and sweeping opponents' stones behind the tee line.) The personnel change was a success, as Gushue defeated Jeff Stoughton's team in the Olympic trials final on December 11, 2005, qualifying him to represent Canada at the 2006 Winter Olympics in Turin, Italy. At the Olympics, he defeated surprise finalist Finland's Markku Uusipaavalniemi to win the gold medal.

With his teammates, Gushue became the first Newfoundlander ever to win an Olympic gold medal. Before the gold medal match, a provincial order allowed for the closure of all schools at noon that day, one hour before local coverage of the event began.

In 2007, Gushue replaced Mike Adam with Chris Schille as second. A month following their runner-up finish at the 2007 Tim Hortons Brier in Hamilton, Gushue announced that Jamie Korab, a longtime teammate, was also cut from the team. Despite a strong Brier appearance and season, Gushue said that the team seemed to lack a needed chemistry and that Korab's departure was a group decision. In 2008, David Noftall assumed the lead position, but this did not prove to be a winning combination.

In April 2008, Gushue replaced his front-end for the sixth straight year: Jamie Korab rejoined the team as lead and Ryan Fry joined the team at second. Gushue failed to make it out of the 2009 Canadian Olympic Curling Trials pre-qualifying tournament, where they won just one game.

In April 2010, Randy Ferbey joined Gushue's team holding the broom but throwing third rocks. Gushue continued to throw last rocks. Mark Nichols moved from third to second position and Ryan Fry played lead. Jamie Korab decided to take a year or two off. In their first event as a team, the rink lost to Thomas Lips in the final of the 2010 Baden Masters.

On February 9, 2011, Randy Ferbey announced that he was no longer curling with the Gushue team. He stated, "I was done curling with them in Oshawa (The BDO Canadian Open Grand Slam Event).

For the 2011–12 season, Gushue put together a team of Ryan Fry, Geoff Walker of Alberta, and Adam Casey of PEI.

Gushue played in the 2013 Canadian Olympic Curling Trials – Road to the Roar and just missed out on advancing to the 2013 Canadian Olympic Curling Trials, losing to the eventual Olympic gold medallist Brad Jacobs rink in the final qualifying game.  He would still be at the Olympic Trials as the alternate for Kevin Martin's team, winning a bronze medal as the alternate.

He teamed up with Val Sweeting at the 2018 Canadian Mixed Doubles Curling Olympic Trials, finishing as runner-up.

In 2020, Gushue played with his 12-year-old daughter Hayley at the Newfoundland and Labrador mixed doubles championship.  The duo made it to the final, earning the silver medal.

In 2022, Gushue announced that their second Brett Gallant would be departing the team due to him moving out of Newfoundland.

Brier appearances 
Gushue has played in 20 Briers, all for his native Newfoundland and Labrador except in 2018, 2019, 2021, and 2023, where as defending champion, his rink was designated Team Canada. He made his first showing at the Brier (Canadian Men's National Championship) in 2003 and has continued to represent Newfoundland and Labrador each year since, except in 2006, when he was unable to participate due to being at the Olympics in Italy. In 2004, Brad Gushue was named the All Star skip at the Nokia Brier.

Gushue won the 2007 provincial championship, defeating Trent Skanes in the final. Gushue seemed ready to add a Brier title to his Olympic Gold, finishing the round robin of the 2007 Tim Hortons Brier with a strong 8–3 record for 2nd place, earning himself a spot in the 1v2 Page Playoff game, where he beat Ontario's Glenn Howard (who he had lost to in the round robin) with a calm, measured performance. Critics said he could not muster without Russ any longer with him to tame his overly aggressive tendencies.  His team thus advanced to the finals, where they would have a rematch with Howard, and this time would lose, in a game that would turn when in the 7th end tied 5-5 and with hammer, rather than taking 1, Brad tried an extremely difficult (many said impossible) shot for 3 or 4, which he would miss to give up a crucial steal of 2, firmly handing the momentum over to the Howard side.  This choice led to many of his critics again questioning his brash nature of wanting to go for the boldest shots unnecessarily at times and questioning if he could ever win again without strategic mastermind Russ Howard still at his side.

Gushue won his second straight provincial title, defeating Labrador City's Keith Ryan in the 2008 Newfoundland and Labrador Tankard. At the 2008 Tim Hortons Brier, Gushue's team failed to make the playoffs, losing a tie-breaker to British Columbia's Bob Ursel.

At the 2009 Brier, Team Gushue performed strongly, ending the round robin in 3rd place.  However, a loss in the 3v4 game to eventual runner-up Jeff Stoughton left him finishing the event in 4th place.

In 2010 Gushue would again be a playoff team, ending the round robin in 4th place.  However, he would lose to eventual winner Kevin Koe in the 3v4 game, for the 2nd straight year finishing in 4th place.

During the 2011 Tim Horton's Brier event in London, The Gushue Rink won the first-ever Brier bronze medal game, defeating Kevin Martin (Alberta) 10–5.  He had an excellent round robin, for the first time in his career, finishing the round robin in 1st place at 9-2 (Jeff Stoughton and Kevin Martin were also 9-2 but had lost their round robin meetings with Gushue).   He would lose both the 1v2 game to Stoughton and the semifinal to Glenn Howard.  Still, this would be his first podium finish at the Brier since his silver in 2007 and his second medal overall.

Gushue missed the playoffs at the 2012 Tim Hortons Brier, posting a 5–6 record.

At the 2013 Tim Hortons Brier, his rink made the playoffs again after an 8-3 round robin record. However, the team would lose in the 3v4 Page Playoff game against Northern Ontario, and then they would fall again in the bronze medal game to Ontario, settling for 4th place.

At the 2014 Tim Hortons Brier, Gushue missed the playoffs for the 2nd time in 3 Briers, posting a 6–5 record.

At the 2015 Tim Hortons Brier, Gushue would have a great round-robin, finishing 2nd at 9–2, including making the shot of the week to win in an extra end against Alberta. Said shot earned him an appearance on TSN SportsCentre's "1v1" segment and ultimately became the first athlete to retire as 1v1 Champion, winning the fan vote ten times in a row against other spectacular plays in the world of sports. In the playoffs, Gushue would lose both the 1v2 game to the 2014 Olympic and 2013 Brier Champion, Brad Jacobs, and the semifinal to eventual winner Pat Simmons. In the bronze medal game against Steve Laycock's Saskatchewan team, Gushue would lose in an extra end when he missed a difficult runback shot.

Gushue won the Ford Hot Shots skills competition at the 2016 Tim Hortons Brier.   He finally made his second Brier final nine years after his loss to Glenn Howard in the 2007 Brier final, advancing by defeating his longtime nemesis Brad Jacobs in the 1v2 game, but as the favourite would fall to Kevin Koe who had come all the way from the 3v4 game.  Both teams curled strongly in the final, with Team Gushue at 91% and Team Koe at 94%, but the main difference was at skip position, where Brad was a disappointing 81% vs the near-perfect 96% of Kevin Koe.

In 2017 he played the Brier in his home province, and there was high hype for him to finally break the 41-year-old drought since the last Newfoundland Brier win and, at long last, win his first Brier after numerous near misses.  The previous Brier winners, Jack MacDuff and his teammates from 1976, were in the crowd during the Opening Ceremonies.  Starting in shaky form at 3–2 with losses to both Mike McEwen and shockingly, the Northwest Territories (whose win over Gushue would be their only win of the entire round robin), Gushue found his form thereafter and reeled off six consecutive wins to end up at a 9–2 record and 2nd place after the round robin.  For the third time in his career, he would advance to the final by virtue of winning the 1v2 Page Playoff game, this time over Mike McEwen who had come into the playoffs as the #1 seed (with an identical 9–2 record, broken by virtue of his round robin win over Gushue).  In a rematch of the 2016 final, he would face Kevin Koe (now representing Team Canada), who, just as in 2016, had come through the 3–4 game to the final and who had overcome a big deficit (5-3 without hammer) in beating Mike McEwen in the semifinals.  In the final, starting with near-flawless play, Gushue would jump to a 5–1 lead. However, the team began to struggle slightly, compared to Team Canada, and with Team Koe curling better in the second half of the game, managing to tie the game in the 9th, at 6-6. On his final shot of the 10th end, Gushue nearly came up short in a draw shot, needing to hit the 8 foot to win, but his sweepers were able to get it there for him to finally win his first Brier with a 7–6 triumph.

On March 5, 2018, early in the 2018 Tim Hortons Brier, Gushue skipped the 114th win of his Brier career, breaking a three-way tie for the most Brier game wins as a skip with previous record-holders Russ Howard and Kevin Martin. His first victory occurred on March 1, 2003, 15 years earlier. Gushue, who was skipping Team Canada as defending champions would go on to win the event, claiming his second straight Brier title.

Gushue represented Team Canada once again at the 2019 Tim Hortons Brier. After finishing the round robin with a 9–2 record, the team lost the 3v4 Page Playoff game to Team Wild Card, skipped by Brendan Bottcher. The loss forced Gushue to play in the Newfoundland and Labardor Tankard for the first time since 2017. He won the Tankard for the 15th time and represented his province at the 2020 Tim Hortons Brier. Gushue led his rink to an 8–3 record at the Brier. He won three straight games in the playoffs to claim his third Brier championship, defeating Bottcher (skipping Team Alberta) in the final. It would be Gushue's last game for nearly eight months, as the season was cut short due to the COVID-19 pandemic, forcing the 2020 World Men's Curling Championship (which he qualified for as Brier champion) to be cancelled.

Despite not being able to represent Canada at the World Men's Curling Championship, Team Gushue was designated as Team Canada at the 2021 Tim Hortons Brier, which was held in Calgary, Alberta. After going 6–2 in the round robin, Team Gushue split their games in the championship pool, finishing with an 8–4 record and not advancing to the playoffs for the first time since 2014.

World Championship appearances 
By winning the 2017 Tim Hortons Brier, Gushue also earned the right to represent Canada at the 2017 Ford World Men's Curling Championship. The team finished in first place by going undefeated in round robin play with an 11–0 record. They defeated team Sweden, skipped by Niklas Edin in the page playoff 1v2 game by a score of 7–4. Once again, they defeated Sweden, this time by a score of 4–2, in the gold medal game to claim the World title. Their performance at the World's earned them a spot in the 2017 Canadian Olympic Curling Trials.

Gushue once again represented Canada at the 2018 World Men's Curling Championship. They finished the round robin with a 9–3 record. In the playoffs, they knocked off the United States and Scotland to make it to the final, where they faced Sweden's Edin rink in a rematch of the 2017 final. This time, Edin got the better of Gushue, defeating Canada 7–3.

2022 Winter Olympics
Gushue's team qualified as the Canadian representatives for the 2022 Winter Olympics by winning the 2021 Canadian Olympic Curling Trials, defeating Brad Jacobs 4–3 in the final. The team would go onto win the bronze medal.

Grand Slam record 
Gushue's first Slam final was in 2005 when he finished second after losing to Kevin Martin in the final game of Players' Championship.

He would not make it past a quarterfinal of another Grand Slam until the 2008–2009 season, where he would have a strong Grand Slam season, reaching the semis of the Masters and the final of the National, where he lost to Wayne Middaugh.

In 2009–2010, he had an excellent Grand Slam season reaching the semis of the Masters, the finals of Players Championship, where he lost to Kevin Martin, and at The National facing Randy Ferbey in the final, Gushue won the game, earning his first Grand Slam title of his career.

After a stretch of years of some unspectacular results in the Grand Slam events, he would have another strong season in 2013–2014 with two finals, losing in the finals of the National to Glenn Howard and the Canadian Open to Kevin Koe.

In the 2014–2015 season, Gushue had a spectacular season, winning both the Masters (over Mike McEwen in the final) and the Canadian Open (over Steve Laycock in the final) to win 2 Grand Slam events in the same season for the first time of his career.

Gushue would have another great season in 2015–2016, where he won The National over Reid Carruthers in the final, the Elite 10 also over Reid Carruthers in the final, and the Players Championships over Brad Jacobs in the final, both completing his career Grand Slam and being the first to win 3 Grand Slam events in the same season since Kevin Martin in the 2006–2007 season. This season featured 7 Grand Slam events for the first time in history, after having been 5 in 2014–2015 and 4 every other prior year in the history of the Grand Slam events.

Gushue won his 7th Grand Slam at the 2017 Meridian Canadian Open with an 8–3 win over the 2-time World Champion Niklas Edin of Sweden. The following season, he won his eighth career Slam by winning the 2017 GSOC Tour Challenge over Slam-newcomers Steffen Walstad's rink from Norway. He won the next event, the 2017 Masters of Curling, defeating Edin in the final. He won his 10th slam at the end of the season, defeating Glenn Howard at the 2018 Humpty's Champions Cup. The following season, he won the 2018 Elite 10, defeating Carruthers in the final. He did not win another Slam until 2021, winning The National by defeating Scotland's Bruce Mouat in the final. He won his 13th Slam at the end of that season, defeating Koe in the final of the 2022 Champions Cup.

Personal life 
Gushue is the son of Ray and Maureen and began curling in 1989. In his youth, he also played golf. Gushue is currently a business owner, co-owning an Orangetheory Fitness Studio in St. John's with teammate Mark Nichols. Gushue married Krista Tibbo on September 8, 2006. They have two children, Hayley and Marissa.

In 2006, Gushue co-authored a book with Alex J. Walling titled Golden Gushue: a Curling Story, which offers a behind-the-scenes look at the rise of his team to Olympic gold.

Gushue is ambidextrous — while he curls right-handed, he writes with his left hand.

Gushue has a Bachelors of Business Administration from Memorial University and is currently studying for a Master's in business from Queen's University.

Teams

Awards
Canadian Junior Curling Championships: All-Star Skip - 2000 and 2001
Brier: First Team All-Star, Skip - 2004, 2017, 2018, 2021 and 2022
Brier: Second Team All-Star, Skip - 2010, 2013, 2015, 2016, 2019 and 2023
Brier: Hec Gervais Most Valuable Player Award - 2017, 2018, 2020 and 2023
World Men's Curling Championship: All-Star Skip - 2017

Notes

References

External links 

 
 Team Gushue
 Golden Dream (Team Gushue fan site)
  Canadian Curling Association
 Brad Gushue on Real Champions

1980 births
Living people
Canadian male curlers
Curlers from Newfoundland and Labrador
Sportspeople from St. John's, Newfoundland and Labrador
Curlers at the 2006 Winter Olympics
Curlers at the 2022 Winter Olympics
Olympic gold medalists for Canada
Olympic bronze medalists for Canada
Olympic curlers of Canada
Olympic medalists in curling
Medalists at the 2006 Winter Olympics
Medalists at the 2022 Winter Olympics
Continental Cup of Curling participants
People from Mount Pearl
Brier champions
World curling champions
Pan Continental curling champions
Members of the Order of Newfoundland and Labrador
Canada Cup (curling) participants
Memorial University of Newfoundland alumni
Queen's University at Kingston alumni
Businesspeople from St. John's, Newfoundland and Labrador
Canadian mixed doubles curling champions